The 1982 Army Cadets football team was an American football team that represented the United States Military Academy in the 1982 NCAA Division I-A football season. In their third season under head coach Ed Cavanaugh, the Cadets compiled a 4–7 record and were outscored by their opponents by a combined total of 271 to 164.  In the annual Army–Navy Game, the Cadets lost to Navy by a 24–7 score.

Schedule

Roster
 LB Jim Mitroka
 Nate Sassaman

References

Army
Army Black Knights football seasons
Army Cadets football